It's Our Stuff is a Canadian music variety television series which aired on CBC Television in 1969.

Premise
This series featured numerous new artists performing works of comedy, dance and music. Alan Thicke was a series regular. Doug Riley and Rick Wilkins provided musical arrangements, while music producer Bob Ezrin was a series writer. Some performers previously appeared on The Good Company (1968–1969) which was also produced by Dave Thomas and featured a similar concept.

Scheduling
This half-hour series was broadcast on Mondays at 9:00 p.m. (Eastern) from 30 June to 8 September 1969.

References

External links
 
 

CBC Television original programming
1969 Canadian television series debuts
1969 Canadian television series endings